Noah Fant (born November 20, 1997) is an American football tight end for the Seattle Seahawks of the National Football League (NFL). He played college football at Iowa, and was drafted by the Denver Broncos in the first round of the 2019 NFL Draft.

Early years
Before his high school years, Fant attended Morton Magnet Middle school and played football for them. Later, Fant attended and played high school football at Omaha South High School, where he set the record in the state. 86 receptions and 1,700 receiving yards on top of that 15 touchdowns.

College career
During his sophomore season at Iowa, Fant tied the national record for touchdowns by tight ends with 11, and led the nation in yards per catch, averaging 16.5. Fant's 11 touchdown receptions set a school record for touchdown catches by a tight end. Fant's efforts garnered him Third-team All-Big Ten honors for the 2017 season and the nickname “The Painter”. Prior to the 2018 season, Fant was named a preseason All American.

On November 30, 2018, Fant announced that he was declaring for the 2019 NFL Draft.

College statistics

Professional career

Denver Broncos
Noah Fant was selected 20th overall by the Denver Broncos in the first round of the 2019 NFL Draft. The Broncos acquired the pick after trading down from their 10th overall selection.

2019

Fant made his NFL debut in Week 1 against the Oakland Raiders. In the game, Fant made two catches for 29 yards and rushed one time for -5 yards in the 24-16 loss.
In Week 4 against the Jacksonville Jaguars, Fant caught two passes for 31 yards and his first career touchdown in the 26-24 loss. During Week 9 against the Cleveland Browns, Fant finished with three catches for 115 receiving yards, including a 75-yard touchdown as the Broncos won 24-19. During Week 14 against the Houston Texans, Fant finished with four catches for 113 yards and a touchdown as the Broncos won 38-24. Overall, he finished his rookie season with 40 receptions for 562 receiving yards and three receiving touchdowns.

2020

In Week 1 against the Tennessee Titans on Monday Night Football, Fant caught 5 passes for 81 yards and his first receiving touchdown of the season during the 16–14 loss.
In a Week 2 against the Pittsburgh Steelers, Fant caught four passes for 57 yards, a touchdown and a two point conversion during the 26–21 loss. Fant finished the 2020 regular season with 62 receptions for 673 yards and 3 receiving touchdowns, improving upon his rookie season.

2021

In Week 6 against the Las Vegas Raiders, Fant caught 9 passes for 97 yards and a receiving touchdown in the 34–24 loss. In Week 17 against the Los Angeles Chargers, Fant caught 6 passes for 92 yards and a receiving touchdown in the 34–13 loss.

Fant finished the 2021 regular season with 68 receptions for 670 yards and a career high 4 receiving touchdowns.

Seattle Seahawks
On March 16, 2022, Fant was traded to the Seattle Seahawks along with two first-round picks, two second-round picks, a fifth-round pick, quarterback Drew Lock, and defensive lineman Shelby Harris in exchange for quarterback Russell Wilson.  On April 12, 2022, the Seahawks picked up Fant's fifth-year option.

NFL career statistics

Personal life
Fant is a Christian. Fant's cousin, Princeton Fant, is currently a tight end for Tennessee.

References

External links
 
 Denver Broncos bio
 Iowa Hawkeyes bio

1997 births
Living people
American football tight ends
Denver Broncos players
Iowa Hawkeyes football players
Players of American football from Nebraska
Sportspeople from Omaha, Nebraska
Seattle Seahawks players